X-15 Flight 91 was an August 22, 1963 American crewed sub-orbital spaceflight, and the second and final flight in the program to fly above the Kármán line, which was previously achieved during Flight 90 a month earlier by the same pilot, Joseph A. Walker. It was the highest flight of the X-15 program. 

Flight 91 was the first internationally recognized spaceflight of a reused spacecraft, as Walker had also flown plane number three on the previous sub-orbital spaceflight over the Kármán line on July 19. The flight was air-launched from a modified Boeing B-52 Stratofortress support plane over Smith Ranch Dry Lake, Nevada, United States. Walker piloted the X-15 to an altitude of 107.96 km and remained weightless for approximately five minutes. The altitude was the highest crewed flight by a spaceplane to that time, and remained the record until the 1981 flight of Space Shuttle Columbia. 

Walker landed the X-15 about 12 minutes after it was launched, at Rogers Dry Lake, Edwards Airforce Base, in California. This was Walker's final X-15 flight.

Crew

Mission parameters
Mass: 15,195 kg fueled; 6,577 kg burnout; 6,260 kg landed
Maximum Altitude: 107.96 km
Range: 543.4 km
Burn time: 85.8 seconds
Mach: 5.58
Launch vehicle: NB-52A Bomber #003

Mission highlights
On this flight, Joe Walker became the first person to enter space twice. He had a maximum speed of 3,794 mph (6,106 km/h) and a maximum altitude of 354,200 feet. Second and final X-15 flight over 67 miles. Unofficial altitude record set for class. Highest altitude achieved by X-15. Last flight for Walker in X-15 program. Number 1 left RCS nozzle froze up. First flight with altitude predictor instrument (needed calibration).

The mission was flown by X-15 #3, serial 56-6672 on its 22nd flight.

Launched by: NB-52A #003, Pilots Russell Bement & Lewis. Takeoff: 17:09 UTC. Landing: 18:56 UTC.

Chase pilots: Wood, Dana, Gordon and Rogers.

The X-15 engine burned about 85 seconds. Near the end of the burn, acceleration built up to about 4 G (39 m/s²). Weightlessness lasted for 3 to 5 minutes. Re-entry heating warmed the exterior of the X-15 to 650°C in places. During pull-up after re-entry, acceleration built up to 5 G (49 m/s²) for 20 seconds. The entire flight was about 12 minutes from launch to landing.

Notes

References

 

 

1963 in spaceflight
091